Glacier Ridge is a broad north–south ridge,  long and  wide, on the southern slopes of Mount Erebus, Ross Island, Antarctica. In association with the names of expedition ships grouped on this island, it was named after the USCGC Glacier, an icebreaker which for three decades, 1955–56 to 1986–87, supported scientific activity in Antarctica and the Ross Sea on virtually an annual basis. From 1955–56, Glacier operated as a US Navy ship. Along with other Navy icebreakers, Glacier was transferred to the US Coast Guard fleet, June 1966, from which she operated until decommissioned, June 1987.

References

Ridges of Ross Island